Lieutenant-General John George Walters Clark CB, MC and bar (2 May 1892 – 16 May 1948) was a senior British Army officer who fought in both World War I and World War II. During the latter he commanded the 10th Armoured Division, formerly the 1st Cavalry Division.

Early life
Clark was educated at Winchester College (1906–1910).

After passing out from the Royal Military College, Sandhurst, Clark was commissioned into the 16th The Queen's Lancers in 1911 and fought with them during World War I. He was twice awarded the Military Cross: first in June 1917 and again in 1918. The citation for this second award, which was published in the London Gazette, stated:

World War II
Between the wars he attended the Staff College, Camberley from 1926 to 1927, and later returned there as an instructor from 1929 to 1932, and, by the time of World War II, he was commanding the 12th Infantry Brigade. From October 1939 to July 1942, Clark commanded the 1st Cavalry Division (re-designated 10th Armoured Division in 1941) as General Officer Commanding (GOC) based in British Mandate of Palestine (Palestine and Trans-Jordan).

In May 1941, Clark formed and commanded Habforce (which when in Iraq became part of Iraqforce) which crossed the desert from Trans-Jordan to relieve RAF Habbaniya during the Anglo-Iraqi War. When Kingcol, the flying column of Habforce, arrived the airfield garrison had already forced the threatening Iraqi force to retire. With the arrival of Kingcol the garrison drove on to capture Falluja and Kingcol then exploited this to advance on Baghdad, arriving on 29 May. The Iraq government capitulated two days later.

Habforce was also involved in the Syria-Lebanon campaign, advancing from eastern Iraq to capture Palmyra on 3 July to secure the Haditha – Palmyra oil pipeline.

In August 1941, the 1st Cavalry Division was reorganised as the 10th Armoured Division. Clark remained in command until April 1942 so missing the division's active service at Alam Halfa and Second Battle of El Alamein. He became GOC Lines of Communication in Tunisia and thereafter Deputy Governor of Sicily after its capture in 1943. At the end of 1943 he briefly became Major-General Administration at GHQ Middle East in Cairo before becoming Chief Administrative Officer at Allied Forces Headquarters (AFHQ) for which he held the acting rank of lieutenant-general.

In late 1944 Clark became head of the SHAEF (Supreme Headquarters Allied Expeditionary Force) mission to the Netherlands. His most notable activity was to prepare food dumps in liberated territory for supply to starving Dutch people as they became liberated following the Hunger Winter of 1944. For this work the Netherlands government made him an Officer of the Order of Orange Nassau with Swords.

Retirement
Clark retired from the army in 1946 as an honorary lieutenant-general with the substantive rank of major-general. He was awarded the United States' Legion of Merit, in the Order of Commander in 1947 having already been given the award in the order of Officer in 1943

Army career summary
 Commissioned into 16th The Queen's Lancers – 1911
 Instructor at Staff College Camberley – 1929 – 1932
 Commanding Officer 16th/5th Lancers – 1933 – 1936
 General Staff Officer 1 War Office – 1937 – 1938
 Commanding Officer 12th Infantry Brigade, France – 1938 – 1939
 General Officer Commanding 1st Cavalry Division, Middle East – 1939 – 1941
 General Officer Commanding 10th Armoured Division, Middle East – 1941 – 1942
 General Officer Commanding Lines of Communications Allied Forces Headquarters, Tunisia- 1942 – 1943
 Deputy Governor of Sicily – 1943
 Major-General Administration GHQ Middle East Command – 1943
 Chief Administrative Officer Allied Forces Headquarters – 1944
 Head Supreme Headquarters Allied Expeditionary Force Mission to Netherlands – 1945
 Head British Economic Mission to Greece – 1945 – 1947. 
Retired -1946.
 on retirement in Athens, early 1947,he bought the ketch, Truant from George Millar with the intention of sailing it home to UK. His intended route was round the Med coast to Marseille then up the Rhone and through the French canals. Millar records that byre tired 1946. 1949 Truant was back in UK waters but Gen Clark Was dead. Is there any record of Gen Clark's voyage home or cause of death at such an early age?

Awards and decorations
 Companion of the Order of the Bath (30 December 1941)
 Military Cross (4 June 1917) and bar (22 June 1918)
 1914 Star & clasp
 British War Medal 1914-1920
 Victory Medal
 Mentioned in Despatches five times (11 December 1917, 5 July 1919, 1 April 1941, 16 September 1943, 2 August 1945)
 Commander of the Legion of Merit (United States, 14 November 1947), previously Officer (10 August 1943)
 Légion d'Honneur (France)
 Croix de Guerre with vermillion star (France)
 Officer of the Order of Orange-Nassau with swords (Netherlands, 8 November 1945)
 Grand Officer, Iftan Niftikar (Tunisia)

Bibliography

References

External links
British Army Officers 1939−1945 
Generals of World War II

 

|-
 

1892 births
1948 deaths
16th/5th The Queen's Royal Lancers officers
16th The Queen's Lancers officers
British Army generals of World War II
British Army personnel of World War I
Commanders of the Legion of Merit
Companions of the Order of the Bath
Graduates of the Royal Military College, Sandhurst
Graduates of the Staff College, Camberley
Recipients of the Legion of Honour
Officers of the Order of Orange-Nassau
People educated at Winchester College
People from Wokingham
Recipients of the Croix de Guerre (France)
Recipients of the Military Cross
British Army lieutenant generals
Academics of the Staff College, Camberley
Foreign recipients of the Legion of Merit
Military personnel from Berkshire